Withdrawal from the North Atlantic Treaty Organization (NATO) is the legal and political process whereby a member of the North Atlantic Treaty Organisation withdraws from the North Atlantic Treaty, and thus the country in question ceases to be a member of NATO.  The formal process is stated in article 13 of the Treaty. This says that any country that wants to leave must send the United States (as the depositary) a "notice of denunciation", which the U.S. would then pass on to the other countries in the alliance. After a one-year waiting period, the country that wants to leave would be out.

Notwithstanding, a number of former dependencies of NATO members have never applied for membership subsequent to their becoming independent states.

Procedure 
Article 13 of the North Atlantic Treaty, is the article that member states use for informing other members or parties that it wishes to leave the North Atlantic Treaty Organisation. It states the following:After the Treaty has been in force for twenty years, any Party may cease to be a Party one year after its notice of denunciation has been given to the Government of the United States of America, which will inform the Governments of the other Parties of the deposit of each notice of denunciation.This means that after 20 years since the signing of the treaty which was in 1949, thus 1969, any member state that wishes to leave just has to inform the United States that it wants to leave, and then after a year it formally leaves.

Contemplated withdrawals

Canada 
In 2019 the Green Party advocated a review of Canadian membership of the alliance. The position of the social-democratic New Democratic Party is complicated; while there is general support for NATO membership within the party, including from former party leaders Jack Layton and Tom Mulcair, the NDP Socialist Caucus advocates revoking Canada's membership. Some of the reasons for opposition to membership of the alliance include membership being incompatible to the Canadian tradition of peacekeeping and concerns of Canadian sovereignty over its defence forces.

, the general consensus of the Canadian government is to support NATO membership as part of national defense policy. Parties that exist in the Canadian Parliament that support NATO membership include the governing left-of-centre  Liberal Party, the opposition right-of-centre Conservative Party, and the Quebec sovereigntist Bloc Québécois.

France 
In 1966, due to souring relations between Washington and Paris because of the refusal to integrate France's nuclear deterrent with other North Atlantic powers, or to accept any collective form of control over its armed forces, French president Charles de Gaulle downgraded France's membership in NATO and withdrew France from the NATO Military Command Structure to pursue more independent defence options. However, he also stated that France would remain in the alliance even after the end of the 20-year commitment period in 1969, unless the “fundamental elements of the relations between East and West” changed.

In 2009, France rejoined the NATO Military Command Structure. The reversal was announced by President Nicolas Sarkozy and backed by the Parliament of France.

Currently, of the noted political parties in France; those advocating withdrawal from NATO include the souverainist Popular Republican Union, together with the left wing La France Insoumise and the far left French Communist Party. The right-wing Gaullist Debout la France and the nationalist National Rally advocate reversing the 2009 decision for France returning to NATO command. In a 2017 poll, 60% of French people viewed NATO favorably, and 34% unfavorably.

Germany 
During the conversations leading to the German reunification, the Soviet Union sought to move the union of West Germany (in NATO) and  East Germany (in the Warsaw Pact) into neutrality and de-nuclearization. 
However, West German chancellor Helmut Kohl and American president George H. W. Bush wanted the united Germany to remain in NATO in spite of less than 20% of West Germans wanting to remain in NATO after the reunification.
Mikhail Gorbachev finally removed the Soviet objection and the new eastern territories of Germany became covered by NATO on the condition that no foreign forces or weapons of mass destruction were to be located on them.

Greece 

In 1964, due to the Cyprus crisis, Greece withdrew military units from NATO forces in the Southern Mediterranean, over threats of invasion of Cyprus by fellow NATO member Turkey. Later in 1974 due to the invasion of Cyprus by Turkish forces, Greece withdrew from NATO military command. Notwithstanding, the country did not withdraw entirely from the organisation, but became significantly less active.

In 1980, the Greek foreign minister Konstantinos Mitsotakis made remarks about the situation where he could see Greece fully withdrawing from the organisation. However, later diplomatic pressure from the United States led to Greece fully re-integrating with the alliance.

According to a poll conducted in 2022 NATO remains popular among the Greek public with 78% wanting to remain in the alliance and only 18% wanting to leave.

Iceland 
Iceland is unique amongst NATO members in that it does not have a standing army, and its defence forces consist of a militarised coastguard and a paramilitary peacekeeping force. Iceland's strong pacifist history has led to considerable opposition to NATO membership in Iceland. Nevertheless, the country was a host to the notable United States Navy base at Keflavík airport, near the country's capital Reykjavík. Plus, its location in the middle of the Atlantic Ocean makes it a strategic point for intelligence and signals information.

In 2019, during a visit by the Secretary-General Jens Stoltenberg to Iceland, the Prime Minister Katrín Jakobsdóttir spoke of her support for withdrawing Iceland from NATO. Her party, the Left-Green Movement, is the senior partner of the Icelandic government which also supports withdrawing, but there is not a majority in the Icelandic parliament for withdrawing. In February 2022 (before the Russian invasion of Ukraine), she said that she still opposed NATO, but admitted that there was still public support for membership. As of May 2022, she continued to oppose Icelandic membership in NATO.

A 2022 Gallup poll showed that 75% of Icelanders supported the country's NATO membership, 9% were opposed to it, and 16% were unsure.

Montenegro 
Several political parties in Montenegro, including New Serb Democracy and the Democratic People's Party, oppose NATO membership. The 2020 Montenegrin parliamentary election resulted in a victory for these parties for the first time in thirty years. However, these parties did not formally pursue withdrawal upon taking office.

Netherlands 
The general consensus about the foreign and defence policy of the Netherlands is being a member of the alliance. Its membership is supported by all five main establishment parties in the Staten-General; the conservative-liberal VVD, the social-democratic PvdA, the christian-democrat CDA, right-wing populist PVV, and social-liberal D66. Other parties are supportive but would like to reform the alliance such as the green-socialist GroenLinks. While the far-right populist Forum voor Democratie supports NATO membership, it was reported by the investigative show Zembla that privately the party's leader Thierry Baudet would like the Netherlands to leave NATO and align the country's foreign policy with Russia.

Romania 
Some minor political parties in Romania oppose Romanian membership in NATO. One of them is Noua Dreaptă, which is also against the European Union.

Spain 
The left-wing electoral alliance Unidas Podemos supports Spanish withdrawal from NATO.

Turkey  

Since the 2016 attempted coup d'état, the 2019 Turkish Offensive into North–Eastern Syria, the deterioration of relations between Turkey and the United States, the deterioration of relations between Greece and Turkey, warming relations between Turkey and Russia, and opposition towards Finland and Sweden in regards to possible membership in 2022, there have been calls for Turkey to leave or be thrown out of NATO. Inside Turkey, politicians like the Nationalist Movement Party (MHP) leader Devlet Bahçeli suggested that Turkey leaving NATO should be considered an option. In May 2022, opposition leader Kemal Kılıçdaroğlu said that if the Justice and Development Party and the  Nationalist Movement Party decided to close the Incirlik Air Base to NATO, the Republican People's Party would also support it.

United Kingdom 

The established consensus of the United Kingdom's defence and foreign policy framework includes full membership and participation of NATO. Membership is supported by all three major parties in the UK, including the Conservatives, Labour and the Liberal Democrats. 

Originally out the nationwide parties in the House of Commons, only the Green Party was against NATO membership and advocated leaving the alliance. However, this changed during their 2023 spring conference, when a motion was passed changing the party's viewpoint by abandoning its opposition to NATO. This was done in a review of the party's policies on security and defence, in light of the invasion of Ukraine by Russia.   However, there are individual Members of Parliament who support the UK withdrawing from NATO, such as Jeremy Corbyn.

In October 2017, the youth wing of Labour, Young Labour, passed a motion at their annual conference which called for Britain to withdraw from NATO, stating it was a tool of American imperialism. They reconfirmed their withdrawment position during the 2022 invasion of the Ukraine by Russia on Twitter. Support for NATO is high in the United Kingdom with a poll in 2017 indicating that 62% of British people have a favourable view of NATO, compared with only 19% having unfavourable view of the Alliance.

The situation with whether an independent Scotland should join NATO if it ever achieves independence, has been fraught within supporters of an independent Scotland. Originally the Scottish National Party was against NATO membership, much of this was due to the party's non-nuclear stance with Scotland hosting the Trident nuclear programme at the Clyde Naval Base. This changed in 2012, when the SNP under the leadership of Alex Salmond changed its manifesto saying that it would support NATO membership and would join NATO if Scotland ever becomes independent, provided the alliance respect Scotland's non-nuclear stance. This led to some senior members of the SNP to leave the party, including John Finnie and Jean Urquhart. During the Russo-Ukrainian crisis the SNP's defence spokesmen Stewart McDonald reconfirmed the SNP's support for NATO. 

Other independence parties including the Scottish Socialist Party and the Scottish Greens as well as some in the SNP (mainly on the left) do not support Scotland's membership and would not want to join if Scotland becomes independent.

Compared to the Scottish nationalists, the Welsh nationalist party Plaid Cymru is completely opposed to NATO membership and supports withdrawal from the alliance if Welsh independence is achieved. Instead the party advocates a defence position of non-alignment similar that of Ireland. The leader of Plaid Cymru at the time, Leanne Wood went even as far as criticizing her Scottish counterparts in an interview.

Among the parties in Northern Ireland, NATO policy tends to follow along the unionist-nationalist axis using the basis of the UK's membership and Ireland's non-alignment. All the main parties that support Northern Ireland being part of the United Kingdom including the Ulster Unionists and the Democratic Unionist parties, support NATO membership. Meanwhile, the parties that advocate unification of Northern Ireland with the Republic of Ireland, including SDLP and Sinn Féin, support Irish neutrality. Among the non-sectarian parties which are parties are neither unionist nor nationalist; the Alliance Party supports NATO membership, while the Green Party is ambiguous in its viewpoint.

Among British non-governmental organisations, both the pacifist Campaign for Nuclear Disarmament and the Stop the War Coalition advocates British withdraw from the alliance.

United States 
Donald Trump expressed interest in withdrawing from the organization during his 2016 presidential campaign. However, after he was inaugurated in 2017, he stated that the United States would protect allies in the event that Article V is invoked. Nevertheless, the New York Times reported in 2019 that a year earlier, he had already mentioned several times privately that he wanted the United States to leave NATO due to many members not paying the required 2% of GDP funding. Such concerns led the House of Representatives in January 2019, to pass the NATO Support Act (H.R. 676), confirming Congress' support for NATO and prohibiting Trump from potentially withdrawing from NATO. On December 11, 2019, the Senate's Foreign Relations Committee passed a bill to be put in front of Congress which would require congressional approval for American withdrawal from NATO.

Polling conducted by Pew Research Center in 2017, said that 62% of Americans are favorable to NATO compared to 23% who are not favorable. In terms of voters, over three-quarters of Democrats are favorable with just 48% of Republicans favorable. Also they said that a plurality of those surveyed, 47% said NATO does too little globally. In further polling in 2019 on the eve of the 70th anniversary of NATO's founding, 77% of Americans say being a member of NATO is good for the United States.

While both major parties support NATO membership, all the major third parties including the Green Party, the Libertarian Party, and the Constitution Party support withdrawing the United States from NATO.

Former overseas territories and dependencies of NATO member states 
 At the time of the establishment of the North Atlantic Treaty in 1949, many parts of the world were either overseas or dependent territories of countries such as France and the United Kingdom. As such, these regions, which are today independent states such as Algeria and Malta, were then part of NATO. However, the treaty limits involvement to no lower than the Atlantic region of Tropic of Cancer, and thus defacto limits membership to those in North America and Europe as stated in Articles V & VI. This means that once those overseas territories gained independence, those outside that area couldn't rejoin as full members.

Algeria 
When France joined NATO in 1949, the northern African territory of Algeria was part of Metropolitan France. By virtue of this, Algeria was part of NATO since its inception. In fact, Article VI clearly states that an armed attack on Algeria would be considered an attack on NATO.

When Algeria gained its independence from France in 1962, its membership was ceased and the Article VI clause was removed. Like many Maghreb and Arab countries, it aligned itself with the Soviet Union which it ended for Algeria with the end of the Cold War. However, since 2000, Algeria has participated in NATO's Mediterranean Dialogue forum and various training with NATO member countries and military cooperation in the defense industry, especially with Germany.

Malta 
At the time of the signing of the North Atlantic Treaty in 1949, the Mediterranean island of Malta was a dependent territory in a form of a self-governing crown colony of the United Kingdom. Dependent territories like Malta had the international memberships of their mother country, so the island was part of NATO. In fact, the headquarters of the Allied Forces Mediterranean was based in the town of Floriana between 1952 and 1965.

When Malta gained independence in 1964, the country did not apply to join NATO, due to the relations between NATO and the prime minister George Borg Olivier at the time, but nevertheless supported the alliance. This changed in 1971, when the Labour's Dom Mintoff was elected as prime minister and stated that Malta is neutral in its foreign policy, a position which was later enacted into the country's constitution in 1974. Later the country joined the Non-Aligned Movement in 1979, at the same time when the British Royal Navy left its base in Malta Dockyard.

In 1995, Malta joined the Euro-Atlantic Partnership Council multilateral defence forum and NATO's Partnership for Peace defence program. However, it withdrew its membership from both organisations a year later in 1996 by the newly elected Labour government. Maltese foreign policy changed notably in 2004, with the country joining the European Union and it re-joined the EAPC and PfP programs in 2008, pointing to a change in the island's foreign relations. Over time, Malta has been building its relations with NATO and getting involved in wider projects including the PfP Planning and Review Process and the NATO Science for Peace and Security Programme. 

Membership of NATO is not supported by any of the country's political parties including the current governing Labour and the opposition Nationalists. Polling done by the island-nation's Ministry of Foreign Affairs found in February 2022 (before the Russian invasion of Ukraine) that nearly two-thirds support the island's neutral position, and only 6% are against it. NATO's secretary-general Stoltenberg says the alliance fully respects Malta's position of neutrality, and put no pressure for the country to join the alliance.

Cyprus 
Like Malta, Cyprus was a crown colony at the time of the United Kingdom until it gained independence in 1960. As such, Cyprus was also a member of the NATO under the British crown. However, the reason for Cyprus' non-membership is due to the 1974 Cyprus conflict and relations between Greece and Turkey. This reason even extends to Cyprus' non-participation in the Partnership for Peace program and the Euro-Atlantic Partnership Council multilateral defence forum. In May 2022, Cyprus Defence Minister, Charalambos Petrides, confirmed that the country would not apply to NATO despite the Russian invasion of Ukraine. 

However, the Sovereign Base Areas of Akrotiri and Dhekelia remain under British control as a British Overseas Territory.

See also 

Enlargement of NATO
 Withdrawal from the European Union
Withdrawal from the Council of Europe

References 

NATO relations
Opposition to NATO
Politics of NATO
Territorial evolution
Withdrawment of international organizations